Milan Martić (born 18 November 1954) is a Croatian Serb politician and war criminal who served as the president of the unrecognized Republic of Serbian Krajina between 1994 and 1995, during the Croatian War of Independence.

Martić was convicted of war crimes by the International Criminal Tribunal for the former Yugoslavia (ICTY) on 12 June 2007 and sentenced to 35 years in prison.

Biography
Martić was born on 18 November 1954 in the village of Žagrović, in the Knin municipality. He graduated from the Post-Secondary Police School in Zagreb and between 1976-81 worked as a policeman at the Public Security Station (SJB) in Šibenik.

From 1982 onwards, Martić was a Junior Police Inspector in Knin and was eventually promoted to Chief of the SJB.

He was the local police chief in Knin at the time of Croatia's declaration of independence. In 1990, he took on the position of local Serb leader, organizing the Milicija Krajina militia also known as Martić's Police.

From 4 January 1991 to August 1995, Martić held various leadership positions, including President, Minister of Defence, Minister of Internal Affairs, in Serbian Autonomous District (SAO) Krajina and the Republic of Serbian Krajina (both unrecognised).

Also in 1991, Serbian opposition leader Vuk Drašković claimed Martić and Goran Hadžić had organized an assassination attempt on him. Martić replied that this was "an ordinary stupidity" and that "if he were to organize an assassination attempt, he would go through with it." Martić was critical of Drašković as Drašković called against mobilization and called for desertion.

Martić was supported by Slobodan Milošević during the 1993 presidential election in Serbian Krajina. Martić ran for the Serbian Party of Socialists which received significant financial support from Milošević's Socialist Party of Serbia.

In a second round of voting in 1994 he was elected President and remained in power until the fall of Serbian Krajina during Croatia's Operation Storm in 1995. After the fall of the Republic of Serbian Krajina, Martić and a large portion of the Serbian Krajina army and civilians, escaped to Banja Luka. Initially, he was rumored to have been either killed or wounded. He did not issue any statement for a number of days.

Martić went on to announce a plan of guerrilla warfare that would "last until the final freedom of the Republic of Serbian Krajina". Martić said in a statement:

ICTY prosecution

Initially indicted by the International Criminal Tribunal for the Former Yugoslavia (ICTY) on 25 July 1995, Martić surrendered on 15 May 2002, and was transferred to the tribunal in The Hague the same day. He was charged with murder, persecution, inhumane treatment, forced displacement, plunder of public or private property, and wanton destruction of cities, towns or villages. He pleaded not guilty to all counts.

According to the ICTY, in the amended indictment, he "helped organize an ethnic cleansing campaign of Croats and other non-Serbs from Krajina and virtually the entire non-Serb population was forcibly removed, deported or killed". He was originally charged only with ordering a rocket attack on Zagreb which killed seven civilians as retaliation to Operation Flash. Two days later, in an interview, Martić admitted he had personally ordered the shelling of the city.

Milan Babić, who, along with Martić, was one of the most important leaders of the rebel Croatian Serbs, stated in court during Martić's trial that the entire war in Croatia was Martić's responsibility, orchestrated by Belgrade.

His trial started on 13 December 2005 and ended on 12 January 2007.

On 12 June 2007, Martić was sentenced to 35 years in prison. His sentence of 35 years in prison was confirmed by ICTY appellate council on 8 October 2008. He was found to have been part of a "joint criminal enterprise" which included Blagoje Adžić, Milan Babić, Radmilo Bogdanović, Veljko Kadijević, Radovan Karadžić, Slobodan Milošević, Ratko Mladić, Vojislav Šešelj, Franko Simatović, Jovica Stanišić, and Dragan Vasiljković.

In June 2009, he was transferred to Tartu Vangla prison in Estonia to serve out his sentence.

References

External links
 ICTY proceedings on Milan Martić (IT-95-11) "RSK"

1954 births
Living people
People from Knin
Croatian people imprisoned abroad
Croatian prisoners and detainees
Croatian Serbs convicted of crimes against humanity
Croatian Serbs convicted of war crimes
People convicted by the International Criminal Tribunal for the former Yugoslavia
Politicians of the Croatian War of Independence
Police officers convicted of murder
Serbian Party of Socialists (Croatia) politicians
Heads of state convicted of war crimes
Heads of state of states with limited recognition
Heads of state of former countries
Serbian nationalists
Yugoslav police chiefs
Croatian politicians convicted of crimes
Heads of government who were later imprisoned